is a Japanese snack food manufactured by Koikeya. It is a tortilla chip that comes in four flavours: Mexican Chili, Seafood, Super Hot Chili, and Rich Butter Grilled Corn. Don Tacos is sold in 78-95 gram bags, in 47 gram cups that include dipping sauce, and in 50 gram boxes for supermarkets with dipping sauce. The cups come with either BBQ sauce or ketchup sauce, and the boxes come with either hamburger sauce or ketchup dipping sauce.

Old commercials for Don Tacos included stereotypes of Mexican culture along with a chant which can be translated to "Don Tacos Don Tacos I'm happy I can soon eat Don Tacos!"

The Don Tacos mascot is colored red and yellow. It looks like a smiling globe with a moustache wearing a sombrero.

See also
List of Japanese snacks

External links
Koikeya page on Don Tacos

Tortilla